The Collinses' mountain chorus frog (Pseudacris collinsorum) is a species of frog in the family Hylidae. It is endemic to hilly regions of the southeastern United States.

Taxonomy 
Formerly considered a population of the Appalachian mountain chorus frog (P. brachyphona), a study published in 2020 found significant genetic divergence from P. brachyphona and thus described it as a distinct species, P. collinsorum. It was named in honor of herpetologist Joseph T. Collins and his wife, wildlife photographer Suzanne L. Collins. Prior to his passing, Joseph Collins had contributed many specimens to be used in the study.

Distribution 
This species ranges from southwestern North Carolina/southeastern Tennessee, south through northern Georgia to most of Alabama aside from the north (which is occupied by brachyphona), and west to northeastern Mississippi.

Habitat 
This species inhabits drier and/or more pine-dominated areas than P. brachyphona, which in contrast largely inhabits mesic habitats.

Description 
This species is more variable in appearance than brachyphona; although it sometimes displays the same dorsal pattern seen in brachyphona, this pattern can sometimes be broken, or even be lacked altogether on collinsorum. In addition, its call displays a faster pulse rate than that of brachyphona.

References 

Chorus frogs
Amphibians of the United States
Endemic fauna of the United States
Amphibians described in 2020